Amikiri ( or 網剪) is a Japanese yōkai depicted in the Gazu Hyakki Yagyō by Toriyama Sekien.

Concept
It is depicted as a cross between a serpent, bird or a lobster. It has claws similar to that of a crab or a scorpion, but since there is no explanatory text within the book, it is not certain what kind of yōkai it is. Many yōkai depicted in the Gazu Hyakki Yagyō were done in reference to predecessor works like the Hyakkai Zukan, so it can be seen that perhaps it is based on the one that is closest to it in those predecessor works, the kamikiri. It uses its claws to cut fisherman and mosquito nets, which it has a bad habit of, and this behaviour leads to people regarding it as a pest.

In various writings from the Shōwa period, Heisei period, and beyond, the amikiri is explained to be a yōkai that cuts meshes and mosquito nets.

According to the yōkai researcher Katsumi Tada, "ami" (meaning nets) can lead one to think about "ami" (meaning mysidacea) due to being homophones, interpreting it as an invention that Sekien created as a result of playing around with words. However, mysidacea do not possess claws on their front limbs, so there are some voices questioning the idea that mysidacea was ever thought about in the drawing.

Legend
In a book titled Tōhoku Kaidan no Tabi by author Norio Yamada, there is a story taking place in the Shōnai region, Yamagata Prefecture about how there was a fishing village where an amikiri repeatedly cut the fishing nets into pieces, and when one person prevented this by taking the net back home quickly and then hiding it, that person found the mosquito nets hung in the rooms all cut by the amikiri, leading to mosquito bites all over this person's body. The yōkai researcher Kenji Murakami was unable to confirm the existence of a legend about a yōkai called "amikiri" from any other source in Yamagata Prefecture, making it likely that this "legend of the amikiri" was simply Yamada's invention.

Notes

See also
Kamikiri
List of legendary creatures from Japan

Yōkai